The 1982 Escort Championships (also known as the Escort Cup) was an Australian rules football knock out tournament held between March and July 1982. The tournament was organised by Australian Football Championships, and was contested by teams from the Victorian Football League, South Australian National Football League and West Australian Football League. The tournament was won by the Swans, who defeated  in the Grand Final.

Background
The 1982 Escort Championships was the sixth season of the national night premiership competition. The size of the competition was reduced to 18 teams in 1982, after 34 teams had competed in each of 1980 and 1981. The competing teams were all twelve VFL teams, and three teams each from the SANFL and WAFL, who qualified based on their league finishing positions in 1981.

The format for the competition was a simple knock-out tournament. The twelve VFL clubs and the 1981 premiers from both the SANFL and WAFL qualified directly for the round of sixteen; the remaining four qualifiers from the SANFL and WAFL started from the preceding elimination round. With the exception of the initial elimination round, all matches were played at VFL Park on Tuesday nights. Matches were televised. The tournament was mostly played concurrently with the premiership season, although some early matches were played during the preseason.

Qualified Teams

1 Includes previous appearances in the Championship of Australia and NFL Night Series.

Venues

Games

Elimination round

|- bgcolor="#CCCCFF"
| Home team
| Home team score
| Away team
| Away team score
| Ground
| Crowd
| Date
|
|- bgcolor="#FFFFFF"

| Swan Districts
| 21.14 (140)
| Glenelg
| 15.12 (102)
| Subiaco Oval
| 
| Saturday, 13 March
|
|- bgcolor="#FFFFFF"
|  Norwood
| 10.12 (72)
| South Fremantle
| 18.16 (124)
| Football Park
| 
| Saturday, 13 March
|

Round of sixteen

|- bgcolor="#CCCCFF"
| Winning team
| Winning team score
| Losing team
| Losing team score
| Ground
| Crowd
| Date
|
|- bgcolor="#FFFFFF"

| Fitzroy
| 12.13 (85)
| 
| 7.8 (50)
| VFL Park
| 
| Tuesday, 9 March
|
|- bgcolor="#FFFFFF"
| Carlton
| 14.16 (100)
| Port Adelaide
| 5.6 (36)
| VFL Park
| 6,220
| Tuesday, 16 March
|
|- bgcolor="#FFFFFF"
| 
| 12.12 (84)
| 
| 6.5 (41)
| VFL Park
| 6,859
| Tuesday, 23 March
|
|- bgcolor="#FFFFFF"
| 
| 18.13 (121)
| Claremont
| 11.11 (77)
| VFL Park
| 4,552
| Tuesday, 6 April
|
|- bgcolor="#FFFFFF"
| Swan Districts
| 13.9 (87)
| 
| 11.11 (77)
| VFL Park
| 6,504
| Tuesday, 20 April
|
|- bgcolor="#FFFFFF"
| 
| 10.6 (66)
| 
| 2.6 (18)
| VFL Park
| 6,958
| Tuesday, 27 April
|
|- bgcolor="#FFFFFF"
| 
| 16.14 (110)
| 
| 6.11 (47)
| VFL Park
| 4,628
| Tuesday, 4 May
|
|- bgcolor="#FFFFFF"
| 
| 24.16 (160)
| South Fremantle
| 6.9 (45)
| VFL Park
| 4,752
| Tuesday, 11 May
|

Quarter-finals

|- bgcolor="#CCCCFF"
| Winning team
| Winning team score
| Losing team
| Losing team score
| Ground
| Crowd
| Date
|
|- bgcolor="#FFFFFF"
| 
| 12.14 (86)
| 
| 12.8 (80)
| VFL Park
| 7,063
| Tuesday, 25 May
|
|- bgcolor="#FFFFFF"
| 
| 11.16 (82)
| 
| 10.10 (70)
| VFL Park
| 4,228
| Tuesday, 1 June
|
|- bgcolor="#FFFFFF"
| The Swans
| 8.11 (59)
| 
| 7.9 (51)
| VFL Park
| 4,761
| Tuesday, 8 June
|
|- bgcolor="#FFFFFF"
| 
| 33.16 (214)
| Swan Districts
| 4.4 (28)
| VFL Park
| 2,688
| Tuesday, 22 June
|

Semi-finals

|- bgcolor="#CCCCFF"
| Winning team
| Winning team score
| Losing team
| Losing team score
| Ground
| Crowd
| Date
|
|- bgcolor="#FFFFFF"
| 
| 13.12 (90)
| 
| 8.13 (61)
| VFL Park
| 5,642
| Tuesday, 29 June
|
|- bgcolor="#FFFFFF"
| The Swans
| 13.17 (95)
| 
| 6.6 (42)
| VFL Park
| 4,955
| Tuesday, 6 July
|

Final

|- bgcolor="#CCCCFF"
| Winning team
| Winning team score
| Losing team
| Losing team score
| Ground
| Crowd
| Date
|
|- bgcolor="#FFFFFF"
| The Swans
| 13.12 (90)
| 
| 8.10 (58)
| VFL Park
| 20,028
| Tuesday, 20 July
|

Notable events

Swan Districts controversy
The WAFL's Swan Districts Football Club generated controversy when it sent a team of reserves and colts players to contest its quarter-final against  in protest at the rescheduling of the match. The match had already been pushed back from 1 June to 8 June to accommodate an interstate match between South Australia and Victoria on Monday 17 May. Then, after  and  both qualified for the quarter-finals, it happened that those teams would be playing two televised matches against each other inside three days: a league match on Sunday 20 June in Sydney, and then the Escort Cup match on Tuesday 22 June. This was unfavourable for the teams; and in a time when few football matches were broadcast live, it was also unfavourable for the television sponsors. As such, the AFC moved the Swans–St Kilda match to 8 June and the Swan Districts–Richmond match to 22 June.

Swan Districts was unhappy with the way the games were rescheduled. The club was not consulted prior to the AFC announcing the reschedule, and it affected arrangements that the club had already made for a social club function on the night of 8 June. Additionally, the 8 June timing was located between league matches against the WAFL's bottom two teams; but, the 22 June timing was located between league matches against the second- and third-placed teams—and, being placed first at the time, Swan Districts was worried about the effect of a midweek match in Melbourne upon its WAFL premiership aspirations. More generally, Swan Districts coach John Todd was already a vocal critic of the dominance of Victorian influence in the administration of the game at a national level, and he was unhappy at seeing his club treated in a way in which he did not believe a Victorian club would have been treated.

When the reschedule was first announced on 19 May, Swan Districts considered forfeiting the match. On 1 June, the club announced that it had decided that it would send a full-strength team to the match. But, two days before the match, it reneged on this promise, and sent an inexperienced team of reserves and colts players, only two of which had played seniors the previous weekend, and which had a total of 69 senior games' experience across its 21 members. Unsurprisingly, the inexperienced team was completely uncompetitive against Richmond—which was at that time on top of the VFL ladder—and lost the match by 186 points.

The following month, the AFC banned Swan Districts from competing in the Escort Championships until 1985 as punishment for the controversy.

Other notable events
Due to a guernsey clash, Collingwood wore a white guernsey with a black yoke instead of its normal white and black stripes in its match against Swan Districts.
The quarter-final between the Swans and St Kilda was played in a heavy fog. Swans coach Ricky Quade was unable to see the action from the coaches' box, and visibility on the field was reportedly only about six metres. The ground developed frost as the game went on, also affecting handling skills.
For the first time in Escort Cup history, a championship flag was awarded to the winning team in addition to a trophy.

See also

List of Australian Football League night premiers
1982 VFL season

Footnotes
1. During 1982, the South Melbourne Football Club was in transition as it moved to Sydney to become the Sydney Swans. Although it played all of its premiership season home games in Sydney in 1982, the club was still known as South Melbourne until 2 June, after which it was known as simply the Swans. It formally became the Sydney Swans prior to the 1983 season.

References

External links
 1982 AFC Escort Championships - detailed review including quarter-by-quarter scores, best players and goalkickers for each match

Australian rules football competitions in Australia
Escort Championships, 1982